
Cacha Lake is a lake in the La Paz Department, Bolivia. At an elevation of 4,670 meters, its surface area is 0.72 square kilometers.

References 

Lakes of La Paz Department (Bolivia)